Jahanabad (also Romanized as Jahānābād) is a village in Hemmatabad Rural District, in the Central District of Borujerd County, Lorestan Province, Iran. At the 2006 census, its population was 4,115, in 979 families.

References 

Towns and villages in Borujerd County